Mushanga is a village in Gilan Province, Iran.

It may also refer to:
 "Mushanga", a song by Toto from The Seventh One
 Bogger Mushanga (born 6 June 1952), a Zambian triple jumper
 Sydney Mushanga (born 26 April 1977), a Zambian politician